Bristol City was the third of three British cargo steamers of that name built for the Bristol City Line and sailed between Bristol and North America between 1920 and 1943.

Construction
Bristol City was built by Charles Hill & Sons of Bristol in 1920. She made 10 knots.

Career

The ship would have plied the service between Bristol and North America which the Bristol City Line started in 1879 and continued until the 1970s. During the Second World War she was damaged by a bomb in December 1940 while in the Albion Dockyard. After repairs, the ship  was part of convoys of merchant ships across the Atlantic.

Sinking
In April 1943, Bristol City joined Convoy ONS 5 (outward, northbound, slow) from Britain to North America. The convoy was made up of 42 ships, of which 12 or 13 were sunk after the convoy came under sustained attack from German U-boats hunting in packs. Fifteen of the 44 people on board died. Manke fatally damaged Wentworth not long after.  picked up the survivors from both ships who were landed at St Johns in Newfoundland.

References

External links
https://www.flickr.com/photos/glosters/3667976760

1919 ships
Merchant ships of the United Kingdom
Bristol City Line
Ships sunk by German submarines in World War II
World War II shipwrecks in the Atlantic Ocean
Maritime incidents in May 1943